The American Board of Endodontics is the   US certifying body for the specialty of endodontics, It was founded in 1956, and   is sponsored by the American Association of Endodontists. The board  is one of the nine dental  specialty boards recognized by the American Dental Association

References

Endodontics